Ronnie Masterson (4 April 1926 – 10 February 2014) was an Irish actress.

Masterson was born in Dublin.  She trained at the Abbey Theatre and first appeared on stage there in 1944. At the Abbey, she met and then married actor Ray McAnally in 1951, and they remained married until his death, although they resided in different homes; her husband with Irish actress Britta Smith. McAnally and Masterson had four children; Conor, Aonghus, Máire and Niamh.

They formed Old Quay Productions, which presented an assortment of plays such as Who's Afraid of Virginia Woolf?, The Odd Couple and many others.

Masterson had also played in the Edinburgh International Festival and in many Dublin Theatre Festival productions. She has appeared on many series broadcast on RTÉ, BBC and ITV and toured extensively in the United States in her own one woman shows. She made her film debut in 1988, playing Bridie in The Dawning.

In November 2005, she was in the United States again, this time to take the lead role in The Sea Captain, a short film directed by her son, veteran television producer Conor McAnally.

Filmography

References

External links

1926 births
2014 deaths
Irish film actresses
Irish stage actresses
Irish television actresses
Actresses from Dublin (city)